The 2010 Rice Owls football team represented Rice University in the 2010 college football season. The Owls, led by fourth-year head coach David Bailiff, are members of Conference USA in the West Division and played their home games at Rice Stadium. They finished the season 4–8, 3–5 in C-USA play.

Schedule

NFL Draft
7th Round, 254th Overall Pick (last pick also known as Mr. Irrelevant)  by the Houston Texans—Sr. DE Cheta Ozougwu

References

Rice
Rice Owls football seasons
Rice Owls football